Princess Silver is a 2019 Chinese television series based on the novel Bai Fa Huang Fei (lit: The White-Haired Imperial Concubine) by Mo Yanshang. It stars Zhang Xueying, Aarif Rahman, Jing Chao, Luo Yunxi and Chen Xinyu. It aired on iQiyi, Tencent and Youku on May 15, 2019.

Synopsis 

At night, a girl rides a horse through the rain, pursued by assassins. She fights with them, but is eventually captured. She awakens in a palace with no memory of who she is. She is told she is Princess Rong Le, the younger sister of Emperor Rong Qi of the Western Qi Kingdom, and she is to marry Zongzheng Wuyou, the seventh prince of the neighboring Northern Lin Kingdom, to create a marriage alliance between the two kingdoms. However, upon her arrival in Northern Lin, Zongzheng Wuyou refuses to marry Rong Le. WuYou doesn't believe in marriage alliances. Princess Rong Le is wearing a mask per the custom of Western Qi brides (only the groom can remove the mask of his bride) and proposes to the prince to let her stay as in the palace for six months, so as to get acquainted with the prince. If, after six months, the prince still feels the same way about the marriage alliance, then she will return to her country. 

Unbeknownst to anyone, Princess Rong Le was also sent to Northern Lin to fulfill a different mission. It is rumored Minister Qin Yong had written an extraordinary book called the Mountains and Rivers Book which supposedly provides the secret of how a time of prosperity for any kingdom can be obtained. The book was lost when the Qin family was executed for treason. Princess Rong Le is set up a owner of a tea house under the alias of Man Yao to collect information about it, find it and bring it back to Western Qi. Princess Rong Le as Man Yao meets Prince Wuyou and, eventually, fall in love, without him realizing Man Yao’s true identity. 

When Prince Wuyou, finally, realizes Man Yao's true identity, they are forced to separate when Princess Rong Le’s brother Emperor Rong Qi suddenly shows up and forces her to marry the powerful General Fu Chou. 

Everything turns into chaos with new enemies, revenge, double crosses, wars, new alliances, new truths, new lies and betrayals. Princess Rong Le must find out her true identity and try to save both kingdoms from war.

Cast

Main

Supporting

Northern Lin

Western Qi

Chen kingdom

Production
The series began filming in April 2018 at Hengdian Studio, and wrapped up in August 2018.

Soundtrack

Awards and nominations

References 

Television shows based on Chinese novels
Chinese romance television series
Chinese historical television series
2019 web series debuts
Chinese web series
Tencent original programming
2019 Chinese television series debuts
2019 Chinese television series endings
Youku original programming
IQIYI original programming
Television series by Youhug Media